Suleiman Obeid (born March 24, 1984) is a Palestinian footballer currently playing for Al-Am'ary of the West Bank Premier League. He scored his first international goal for Palestine against Yemen during the 2010 West Asian Football Federation Championship. He also represented the national team during 2012 AFC Challenge Cup qualification and 2014 World Cup Qualifying.

National Team Goals

References

1984 births
Living people
Palestinian footballers
Markaz Shabab Al-Am'ari players
Palestine international footballers
Footballers at the 2006 Asian Games
Footballers at the 2010 Asian Games
Association football midfielders
Asian Games competitors for Palestine